Danzey is a railway station which serves the small village of Danzey Green, and the larger but slightly more distant village of Tanworth-in-Arden in Warwickshire, England.

Situated on the North Warwickshire Line, the station was opened by the Great Western Railway in 1908 along with the line, and was originally known as Danzey for Tanworth. It is a few minutes walk from Danzey Green, and around one mile from Tanworth-in-Arden.

Services
The service in each direction between Birmingham and Stratford runs hourly (with most northbound trains continuing to ). Danzey is a request stop: passengers wishing to board a train here must signal to the driver; those wishing to alight must inform the train conductor.

There is no Sunday service.

References

External links

Historical photographs of Danzey station from www.warwickshirerailways.com
Rail Around Birmingham and the West Midlands: Danzey station

Railway stations in Warwickshire
DfT Category F2 stations
Former Great Western Railway stations
Railway stations in Great Britain opened in 1908
Railway stations served by West Midlands Trains
Railway request stops in Great Britain
1908 establishments in England
Tanworth-in-Arden